Aguila is a 1980 Philippine period drama film written, produced and directed by Eddie Romero, touted as "the biggest event in local movie history" and "the biggest Filipino film ever made". It features an ensemble cast topbilled by Fernando Poe Jr.

Synopsis

Flashbacks encompass the history of the Philippines as well as the life story of the elderly Daniel Águila. The Águila family gathers to celebrate Daniel's 88th birthday, but the old man is nowhere to be seen - he has been missing for a decade. Suspecting that his father is in Mindanao, one of his sons takes off for that region in a determined search. Along the way, his memories of the nation and his father's life tell the story of eighty tumultuous years of personal and historical development.

Plot

Aguila chronicles the passionate saga of the life and times of a Filipino family.

It is 1980. The influential and affluent Águila family celebrate the 88th birthday of their missing and long-presumed dead patriarch, Daniel Águila (Fernando Poe Jr.). It truly becomes a celebration of Daniel's life when his son, Mari (Christopher de Leon), receives news that Daniel is alive, living somewhere in the provinces. Mari, a business tycoon and former Senator, combs the countryside in search of his father. In the course of his search, the Águila family history is unravelled. Spanning a period of 80 years, it covers the 1896 Philippine Revolution, the American occupation, the Japanese era, Post-War reconstruction and the student militant activities of the late 1960s to early 1970s.

It all begins when Daniel's father, Artemio (Dave Brodett), an officer in the Revolutionary Army, dies by treachery. His mother, Isabel Teodoro (Amalia Fuentes), is raped by that same traitor, Simeon Garrido (Eddie Garcia), and later marries him for convenience. As a young soldier accompanying Simeon to Mindanao, Daniel again becomes witness to injustice: Simeon and some Americans ruthlessly take away Muslim tribal lands.

Daniel's life is one of complexity - of human emotions and relationships. His affair with a Muslim woman, Farida (Andrea Andolong), results in a love-child, Osman (Jay Ilagan). He marries a lawyer named Sally (Charo Santos), Mari's mother, who later falls ill and dies. He also discovers the incestuous liaison between Simeon and Lilian (Elizabeth Oropesa), who in turn unsuccessfully attempts to seduce him.

Daniel's experiences during World War II and with the American-controlled post-war government only increase his mounting disenchantment with life and society. Mari's amoral political ambitions and his grandson's, Raul (Ricky Sandico), activist stance drives him further into disillusionment. Finally, Daniel heeds his longing for peace and leaves.

Mari's journey ends when he finds Daniel in an Aeta village in Bohol, where Daniel has found serenity, far from the maddening machinations and injustices committed by a civilized society.

Cast of Characters
 Fernando Poe Jr. as Gen. Daniel T. Águila
 Ricky Rivero as young Daniel Águila
 Amalia Fuentes as Isabel Teodoro
 Christopher de Leon as Sen. Mari L. Águila
 Elizabeth Oropesa as Lilian T. Garrido
 Jay Ilagan as Osman Águila
 Charo Santos as Atty. Monica Salvación "Sally" Llamas de Águila
 Chanda Romero as Diwata
 Daria Ramírez as Elvira
 Eddie Garcia as Don Simeon Garrido
 Celia Rodriguez as Margo Cepeda
 Orestes Ojeda as Victor "Vic" L. Águila
 Susan Valdez as Bessie Águila
 Johnny Delgado as Ibrāhīm
 Andrea Andolong as Farida
 Conrad Poe as Karim Águila
 Yvette Christine as Lucy L. Águila-Noriega
 Dave Brodett as Capt. Artemio Águila
 Ruben Rustia as Gen. Caram
 Lito Anzures as Datu Khalid
 Ricky Sandico as Raúl Águila
 Joonee Gamboa as Arcadio "Cadio" Cuevas
 Roderick Paulate as Quintin
 Behn Cervantes as Basilio
 Odette Khan as Binay
 Ariel Muhlach as Danielito Águila
 Rolando Tinio
 R. V. Romero
 Henry Salcedo
 Tom Madden
 Richard Lorentz
 Annie Ferrer
 George Weber
 Maria Luisa Gabaldon
 P. V. Gabaldon
 George Albert Romero
 Dhemy Cardenas
 Serafin Payawal
 Archie Lacson
 Grace Poe
 Malou de Guzman
 The Penthouse 7 Dancers

Production

The film was shot in 120 different locations. The film's Art Director, Mel Chionglo, built a Magdiwang camp and an Ilongot village in the hills of Tanay and an Aeta village in Los Baños. Chionglo had three assistants, two set men and ten carpenters to help in this work. Chionglo also designed sets for an 1897 evening in Binondo, a Muslim waterfront in 1918 Nasugbu, Batangas, a courthouse in 1924 Magdalena, Laguna, a Roaring Twenties cabaret in Makati, a Japanese garrison in Lumban, Laguna, and other settings.

The film took 100 days to shoot the 204 pages of script written for it, the latter having been written over a two-year period.

Actress Rio Locsin was originally cast to play Huk commander Diwata but was replaced by Chanda Romero, director Eddie Romero's niece, when she failed to show up on her first shooting day.

The production was infamously marred by tensions between the crew. Among the reported incidents of tensions flaring up involved Eddie Romero's frequent butting of heads with Mel Chionglo. Romero likewise clashed with set decorator, and now screenwriter, Racquel Villavicencio over unreasonable production demands. Eventually, the differences among the crew members got so unbearable for the film's cinematographer, Mike de Leon, that he walked out on the project altogether. However, while tensions were building between members of the crew, no such tensions were reported among the actors and Romero himself. Romero was described as being a "cool director", not having been angered by the actors on the set. The lone exception of Romero being angered by an actor on the set is when he threatened to renounce his niece, Chanda, if she could not do her kissing scene with Christopher de Leon right.

Romero was notoriously late on the set, but the actors would arrive even later than Romero himself. Despite this however, Romero tolerated the different personalities between the actors and allowed them to bond, usually over meals in between shoots.

Upon the release of the film, a minor criticism launched at it was that the actors who are supposed to age do not look like they aged a day. Most notably, Amalia Fuentes refused to show age in the film despite portraying the mother of FPJ's character, Daniel.

FPJ choreographed the fight and war scenes.

FPJ's daughter, future Senator, Grace Poe cameoed in the film as Daria Ramirez's sister.

In addition, Bancom Audiovision also spent  for an hour-long made for television documentary film on the making of Águila and hired producer Jesse M. Ejército as advertising and marketing consultant.

This is the second of Eddie Romero's epic historical film trilogy, wedged in between "Ganito Kami Noon, Paano Kayo Ngayon?" and "Kamakalawa".

Music
The film's entire music was written by Ryan Cayabyab. Cayabyab also sang the American singer's part during the 1924 cabaret scene.

The film's theme song "Iduyan Mo" was composed by Cayabyab specifically for the film. The song was interpreted by Basil Valdez.

Themes
There are three themes prevalent throughout the film - Family, History and Society and Nationalism

Family
Film director and scribe Nick Deocampo points out that the film may be examined to better appreciate the value of the family as a basic institution of the society. The family as a basic institution of the society was enshrined in §4, Art. II of the 1973 Constitution, the law in force at the time of the film's release, which not only recognizes the family as such but also endeavors to protect and strengthen the same. The same provision was carried over to the 1987 Constitution where an entire section is devoted to the family.

In the film, family life in the Philippines is examined through historical lenses as it depicts the evolution of the Filipino family throughout history and how its values are formed and/or changed.

The family is likewise peered into through the eyes of Daniel Águila as he has lived through an ever evolving and ever growing family - first having grown fatherless and then having a difficult relationship with his mother, Isabel, because of her decision to remarry a man Daniel detests, a choice which was itself imposed upon Isabel by her own parents; then as a family man himself, how Daniel copes with his own children who has views opposite to his and whose views shape the paths they chose to take in life.

The film likewise explores alienation within one's own family, as seen in the experiences of Daniel, Osman, Mari and Lilian who all feel like they are outsiders within their own family at certain points in the film.

Another point the film touches upon is how the family shapes its members, specifically how familial experience molded Daniel Águila as a person. This film has been cited as an unconventional FPJ-movie as it shows FPJ as Daniel Águila being vulnerable, a departure from the typical roles that show Poe as an infallible and incorruptible conquering hero. In the film, Daniel's failings as a man and as head of the family is shown and it examines how these define Daniel as a person and how it influenced the Águila family.

History and Society
Being under the genre of historical drama, the film depicts how values, not only in the family but in the larger Philippine society, evolves. It shows how Daniel and his family and the values they hold are a product of their times, how their choices are informed by the prevailing values and trends of a given period. This is exemplified in the character arc of Mari, who, in entering the political arena becomes swept by its corruption and inevitably becomes part of the machinery that he once sought to change. This is likewise shown in the arc of Raul, who is driven to suicide because of the realization that his hero and mentor, Margo, was willing to give up their cause for personal reasons, much like Cadio and Basilio before her.

Alienation again takes the spotlight as Daniel is driven into abandoning his family and choosing to live in both Cotabato and Bohol to escape a society that has become more and more unfamiliar to him. In both communities, he helps its residents and teaches them self-reliance.

Nationalism
As with Ganito Kami Noon, Paano Kayo Ngayon? the film examines what the social ills the pervades Philippine society and how said problems merely evolve but are never solved.

This pervasive problem is exemplified by the character of Simeon Garrido, who was willing to sell his loyalty insofar as the new colonial masters are willing serve his personal interests. Much later in the film, Mari's entry into politics leads him to "do as the Romans do" and engage in corruption to the detriment of the Filipino people. Similarly, the character arc of Margo shows how those claiming to fight for nationalism can be corrupted when personal interests is thrown into the picture.

Throughout the film, nationalism is a constant frustration for Daniel who has seen how Filipinos are pitted by the Philippines' colonizers against each other; how those who fought for the independence of the Philippines are instead treated like criminals and how those who collaborated with the enemies are given preferred positions. Daniel, in 1945, even laments if his service in the war ultimately redounded to the benefit of but a few, instead of that of the Filipino people.

Release

The film was released on February 14, 1980, and was simultaneously played at 25 theatres across Metro Manila. Prior to the film's Valentine's Day debut, it was previewed thrice and had three premieres.

Re-releases

Years after its initial theatre run, the multi-generational epic has seen newfound appreciation. It has become in recent years among film festival organizers' favorite of Eddie Romero's works and  has consequently seen re-runs for the benefit and appreciation of newer and younger audience.

Among the subsequent screenings that the film has had was at the  9th Cínemalayà Cinesthesia in 2013.

In 2019, ABS-CBN Film Restoration Project and FPJ Productions digitally restored the film. Subsequently, the digitally restored film has been screened at the UP Film Center as part of the UP Film Institute's commemoration of FPJ's 80th birthday. In the same year, the digitally restored version was screened at the 15th C1 Originals.

Awards and nominations

See also 
 The Ravagers (film)
 The Walls of Hell
 Manila, Open City
 Santiago! (film)
 Ganito Kami Noon, Paano Kayo Ngayon?
 Kamakalawa

References

External links

Star Cinema films
Films directed by Eddie Romero
Filipino-language films
1980 films
Philippine historical films